Prithvi Narayan Campus or P.N. Campus,() is a public co-educational institution located in the northern part of the Pokhara city and is one of the largest campuses affiliated to the TU. The institution offers undergraduate(Bachelors) and graduate (Masters & Doctorate) programmes. It is named after the great king; Prithvi Narayan Shah.

History

The campus, initially named Prithvi Narayan College, was established on Sept. 1, 1960, as the first community college of the Kaski district for post-secondary education by local efforts. In its initial years, the classes were conducted in Ratna Rajya Laxmi High School. In 1961, it was granted public land in Bhimkali Patan, Bagar where it currently exists. Regarded as one of the largest affiliate campuses of TU, it is a major center for Undergraduate, Graduate and Post Graduates education in the Gandaki Pradesh.

The campus is regarded as one of the important educational institutions in the country and receives government grants distributed through the TU. In accordance with the TU decentralization act of 1998, the campus elected a management committee in Sept. 1999 which handles tasks such as construction of physical infrastructure, making rules, working plans and economic policies and a sub committee under the management committee looks day-to-day affairs of the campus. The campus is spread over 35 hectares along on the banks of the Seti River. The campus buildings occupy only a small part of its total area; most of the land is open and covered with grass and trees. In 2006, UNDP Global Environmental funded a project to develop this open space as Green Space Park, where university students could learn about environmental conservation and demonstrate the use of open space to serve the leisure and recreational needs of the growing urban population of Pokhara.

Academics

There are altogether 28 departments in the campus of different faculties. The main faculties of this campus are Science, Management, Humanities, Laws and Education. Being a public educational institution, the fees are heavily subsidized by the government. Current students in the campus are from the Pokhara city as well as from surrounding areas of Gandaki Pradesh and its district from surrounding provinces.

Programmes
The campus is providing Undergraduate, Graduate and Post Graduate courses for students. The Undergraduate is the most popular program with Bachelor programs. The Graduate and Post Graduate level consists of Masters and Doctorate programs respectively. Five different faculties are identified: Science, Law, Humanities, Education, and Management. The campus is introducing newer subjects in order to fulfill the requirements to upgrade itself into a full-fledged university.

Science 

The campus has one Institute of Science and Technology affiliated to the TU that oversees 6 departments of the science programs. The science program started with a proficiency certificate level in Science (I. Sc.) in 1968 in the subjects: Physics, Chemistry, Biology, and Mathematics. The two year Bachelor's level in Science (B. Sc.) was started 1987 on the subjects Physics, Chemistry, Mathematics, Zoology, Botany and Statistics. The bachelor's level was transformed into 3 years program in 1998 and as of 2010 the I. Sc. program has been discontinued in accordance with the TU guidelines. The campus has separate buildings for theoretical and laboratory classes.

 Chemistry

The department offers undergraduate degree in Chemistry. It started by introducing intermediate level program (called Proficiency Certificate Level) in August, 1962. Intermediate Sciences Program has been removed from TU affiliation beginning July, 2010, and is now a part of school of education. Bachelor's Degree: The bachelor's degree in science, as part of the Institute of Science and Technology, was started in 1987. Chemistry is offered for both the physical and the biological groups. The traditional classification of biological group is one where students take one or more courses in zoology, botany or microbiology and physical group is one in which students take one or more courses in mathematics, physics or statistics. In the third year, the students have the option to select one of the subjects as a major subject given the prerequisites are fulfilled.  The examination of each course is a written examination conducted TU wide of three hours duration for each subject. The laboratory examination is of six hours duration. The selected subject in the third year is the specialized subject for further studies such as the master's degree program in Chemistry, if it is chosen as the subject of specialization.

 Physics

The department offers both undergraduate and graduate studies in Physics. The organization of the undergraduate physics program is similar to the undergraduate (B. Sc.) program in Chemistry. Students with science background in high school (Physics, Chemistry and Mathematics) are eligible to apply for the undergraduate Physics program and accepted student are classified as Physical Science group and as such must also take courses in Mathematics for at least two years with two more courses in Chemistry or Statistics. Graduate Program: The two years' Masters program in Physics was started in 2008 and enrolls a maximum of 40 students each year. The students are admitted through a common TU wide entrance examination.

 Mathematics

The department offers both undergraduate (B. Sc.) and graduate degrees (M. Sc.) in Mathematics.

 Biology

The Biology Department was established in 1968 and currently offers undergraduate degrees in three major branches Botany, Zoology, and Microbiology.  Separate Botany and Zoology departments were created in 1998 with the launching of the B. Sc. program and the Microbiology program started in 2010.

Laws
Major Laws Class is conducted by P.N. Campus. The laws of Nepal to the international level are held by this institute. International students can also attend their own country's law classes in their own national language.
LLB
BALLB

Humanities (Arts) & Education 
 English
Humanities and Arts classes are taught only in English and Nepali language.

 Mathematics
The Art and Education faculties student are also taught Mathematics.

 History
There are also history classes for Art and Humanities students.

Management (Commerce)

Management classes started in September 1969 with eleven students in the first year of Intermediate in Commerce program. Undergraduate classes offering a bachelor's degree in commerce began in 1976 with 25 students. In 1990 the campus started offering master's degrees in Commerce. Unlike the heavily subsidized intermediate and bachelor's degree program, the master's program is supported by students' fees. Some of the famous programs of commerce in this campus are :

 BBA
BBA stands for Bachelor in Business Administration. This Course was initiated in the year 2069 BS in this Campus. It is an 8-semester-long program initiated by the Campus itself without subsidization by the TU program, Hence, it is one of the expensive course in the campus after L.L.B. The BBA class are based on semester system and are run in the day shift only. The current BBA quota for this campus is about 99 student in one semester. There are only two public campuses in the Kaski district to provide TU's BBA programs.
This program is said to be the only Non-Political Course or Politically Uninfluenced Course on campus.

 BPA
BPA stands for Bachelor in Public Administration. It is an 8-semester-long program initiated by the Campus itself without subsidization by the TU program. The BPA class are based on the semester system and are run in the day shift only. The current BPA quota for this campus is about 66 students in one semester.

 BBS
BBS stands for Bachelor of Business Studies. It is 4 years program initiated by the Campus and subsidization by the TU program. The BBS class are based on annual system and are run in the morning shift only. The current BBS quota for this campus is about 200 student in one year.
 MBS
MBS stands for Master of Business Studies. It is 3 years program initiated by the Campus and subsidization by the TU program. The MBS class are based on annual system and are run in the morning shift only. The current MBS quota for this campus is about 60 student in one year.

Free Students' Union

The Tribhuvan University law requires its affiliate campuses to allow the formation of democratic Free Student Unions (Nepali : स्वतन्त्र बिद्यार्थी युनियन) mandated with handling extra curricular activities of the campus and matters related to student affairs. Although the student union was conceived as an organization to be the direct representatives of students of the college, their activities are more inclined towards the politics of the country. Therefore, they are also called student political parties. The major student parties are Nepal Student Union, All Nepal National Free Students Union and All Nepal National Independent Students' Union (Revolutionary) and participate in the elections to form the student union council of the campus that has a term of 2 years. All Nepal National Free Students Union, a student wing of CPN(UML) currently holds a majority of seats in the student union council and has been winning the elections successively since the establishment of the free student union in 1969.

Violent clashes between different student political parties are common, they are also frequently accused of vandalization of campus property. Awareness Group of Technical Science (AGTS) is another organization on the PN campus that is not affiliated with any political parties. It currently works as a mediator between students and the campus administration.

Sports

The campus has substantial land space that is utilized for major tournaments held in Pokhara. Free student union organizes annual sports events between different departments and academic levels. The campus has two volleyball courts, two basketball courts, facilities for martial arts (taekwondo, wushu, and karate), a cricket pitch and a football field. Football, cricket, basketball, and volleyball are the major sports held on this campus.

Annapurna Natural History Museum

The Annapurna Natural History Museum is one of the main feature in the campus that displays the natural history of the area near to the Annapurna Mountain and has a collection of butterflies, insects, birds and stuffed and sculpted models of wildlife found in the region around the Annapurna Mountain of Nepal. The museum opens from 9:00 am to 5:00 pm from Sunday to Thursday and from 9:00 am to 12:45 pm on Fridays except the day of national or provincial holidays and the entry is free.

Hostel

There are four hostels within the PNC (Prithvi Narayan Campus) premises which are categorized as Science Hostel (for males majoring in subjects classified as science), Girls’ Hostel (for unmarried female students), Ladies’ Hostel (for married female students) and Gents’ Hostel (for males) and can accommodate a total of 200 students. The meals program in the hostel is run on a cooperative basis by the students. A hostel-committee under Free Students' Union decides allocation of hostel facilities to the students based on their financial status, geographical remoteness of their home district, etc. However, there are constant allegations that students with political contacts get selected preferentially and many such occupants do not vacate even after completion of their studies.

Housing

The campus has its own housing quarters located within the campus premises for its employees.

Most non-local students live off campus in rental houses near the campus. Bagar, Adhikari Tole, Deep, Fulbari, and Nadipur, are some of the areas popular among students for rental houses.

References 

Tribhuvan University
Education in Pokhara
1960 establishments in Nepal